Gazvoda is a Slovenian surname. Notable people with the surname include:

 Gregor Gazvoda (born 1981), Slovenian cyclist
 Jože Gazvoda (born 1949), Slovenian skier
 Nejc Gazvoda (born 1985), Slovenian writer, screenwriter, and director

Slovene-language surnames